Myconius is a surname. Notable people with the surname include:

 Friedrich Myconius (1490–1546), German theologian
 Oswald Myconius (1488–1552), Swiss theologian and reformer